The 2004 season in the Latvian Higher League, named Virslīga, was the 14th domestic competition since the Baltic nation gained independence from the Soviet Union on 6 September 1991. Eight teams competed in this edition, with Skonto FC claiming the title.

Final table

Match table

Relegation play-offs
The matches were played on 14 and 17 November 2004.

|}

Top scorers

Awards

References

Latvian Higher League seasons
1
Latvia
Latvia